KRI Makassar (590) is the lead ship of the Makassar-class landing platform dock of the Indonesian Navy.

Development and design 

Indonesia signed a US$150 million contract in December 2004 and the first two units were built in Busan, South Korea. The remaining two were built at Indonesia's PT PAL shipyard in Surabaya with assistance from Daesun.The contract for the 3rd and 4th LPD to be built in Indonesia was signed with PT PAL on March 28, 2005.

On 19 October 2006, the first of the two Indonesian-built units, was laid down in a ceremony by Admiral Slamet Subiyanto, Chief of Staff, Indonesian Navy. The 3rd and 4th units had been designed to function as flagships with provisions for a command and control system, 57mm gun and air defence systems.

The 5th ship ordered by Indonesian navy on January 11, 2017. First steel cutting ceremony for said ship was conducted on April 28, 2017. The ship's keel was laid on August 28. 2017.

Construction and career
Makassar was laid down and launched on 7 December 2006 by DSME at Busan. She was commissioned on 29 April 2007.

KRI Makassar arrived at Pearl Harbor on 26 June 2018 in preparation for RIMPAC 2018 from 27 June to 2 August.

References

== External links ==

2006 ships
Ships built by Daewoo Shipbuilding & Marine Engineering
Amphibious warfare vessels of the Indonesian Navy
Makassar-class landing platform docks